John Hess may refer to:

John Hess (journalist) (born 1955), British journalist for BBC East Midlands
John L. Hess (1917–2005), American journalist
John George Hess (1838–1915), Ontario businessman and political figure
John B. Hess (born 1954), chairman and CEO of Hess Corporation
John R. Hess, American physician

See also
Jon Hess (disambiguation)